Sauerkraut is a German television series and a book

Plot 
The village  Sauerkraut is the place, Sauerkraut was invented.

The characters are:

 Amadeo, a cock
 Amadea, a hen 
 Bürgermeister Eberle, a pig, is the mayor
 Frau Eberle, his wife
 Dudu, a creature, near a sheep, the village underdog and main protagonist.
 Bossi, a crocodile, symbolizes the capitalist and the main antagonist
 Joey, dog, son of Bodo
 Nandi, a hen, girlfriend of Joey and daughter of Amadeo 
 Fraulein Turtel, a turtle is the teacher
 Bodo, dog and sheriff
 Tante Emma, retailer — a mouse
 Spiritus, priest — a stork
 Professor Knödelmeyer, a goat, inventor and henchman of Bossi
 Frau Doktor, a fox, practitioner and doctor
 Anna, goose, waitress

All these figures are named according to the characters, they symbolize.

Episodes

900 years of Cabbage
Fishbone
Christmas
Concert
Burning
Friday of 13
Miracle Cure
Accident
Secret Recipe
Hollywood
Bell
Skull from Lake
The Will

See also
List of German television series

External links

References 

German children's animated television series
1992 German television series debuts
1993 German television series endings
German-language television shows
ZDF original programming